Jalan Bypass (Johor state route ) is a main state road in Johor, Malaysia. It is also a shortcut to Gemas.

List of junctions

References

Roads in Johor